Haute-Avesnes is a commune in the Pas-de-Calais department in the Hauts-de-France region of France.

Geography

Population

Places of interest
 The Commonwealth War Graves Commission cemetery.
 The church of St.John, rebuilt early in the 20th century.
 The war memorial.

See also
Communes of the Pas-de-Calais department

References

External links

 The CWGC cemetery at Haute-Avesnes
 The war memorial 

Hauteavesnes